Louis Joseph Lahure (29 November 1767 – 24 October 1853) was a general in the service of the First French Republic and First French Empire.

Biography

Early life 
Louis Joseph Lahure was born on 29 November 1767 in Mons in the Austrian Netherlands. He was the son of Nicolas Lahure and Marie-Thérèse du Buisson. He had a brother, Germain Lahure. He studied at the Old University of Leuven.

Career 
Lahure served in the Brabant Revolution in 1787. He moved to Lille in France in 1790. He served in the Army of the North under General Nicolas Luckner. He served in the Army of Sambre-et-Meuse.

He became a general. Occupying Holland in January 1795, the French continental army learned that the Dutch navy had been frozen into the ice near Texel Island. Lahure and 128 men simply rode up to it and demanded surrender. No shots were fired and the Dutch fleet was captured.

Lahure became a naturalised French citizen. He was made a Grand Officier of the Legion of Honour and the Order of Leopold. He was also made a Knight of the Order of Saint Louis.

Personal life 
Lahure married Anne de Warenghien de Flory in 1800. They had seven children and resided at the  de Wavrechain-sous-Faulx in northern France.

He died on 24 October 1853.

Legacy 
His name is inscribed on the Arc de Triomphe in Paris. In 1895, Lahure's grandson published his memoirs.

References 

1767 births
1853 deaths
Belgian generals
French military personnel of the French Revolutionary Wars
French military personnel of the Napoleonic Wars
Grand Officiers of the Légion d'honneur
People from Mons
People of the Brabant Revolution
Names inscribed under the Arc de Triomphe
Belgian emigrants to France